Gregory R. Weissert (born February 4, 1995) is an American professional baseball pitcher for the New York Yankees of Major League Baseball (MLB). The Yankees selected Weissert in the 18th round of the 2016 MLB Draft. He made his MLB debut in 2022.

Early life and amateur career
Weissert grew up in Bay Shore, New York and attended Bay Shore High School. He was an All-County selection in both baseball and volleyball. Weissert attended Fordham University, where he played college baseball for the Fordham Rams for three seasons. As a junior, he went 5–4 with a 4.04 ERA and 82 strikeouts over 14 starts.

Professional career
The New York Yankees selected Weissert in the 18th round of the 2016 MLB Draft. After signing with the team he was assigned to the Pulaski Yankees before earning a promotion to the Class A Charleston RiverDogs. Weissert spent the 2017 season with the Class A Short Season Staten Island Yankees. He returned to Charleston for the beginning of the 2018 season before earning a promotion to the Tampa Tarpons of the Class A-Advanced Florida State League after striking out 50 batters with a 2.62 ERA over  innings. Weissert started the 2019 season with the Tarpons and was promoted to the Double-A Trenton Thunder, where we posted a 1.88 ERA over 14 relief appearances and was eventually promoted to the Triple-A Scranton/Wilkes-Barre RailRiders for the team's postseason. Baseball America rated Weissert as having the best slider in the Yankees' minor league system going into the 2021 season. After starting the year with the Yankees' new Double-A affiliate, the Somerset Patriots, Weissert was promoted to Scranton/Wilkes-Barre after posting a 0.71 ERA in  innings pitched over 12 appearances. In 2022, Weissert served as Scranton/Wilkes-Barre's closer.

On August 25, 2022, the Yankees selected his contract from Scranton/Wilkes-Barre. In his major league debut that night, he hit the first batter with his first pitch, committed a balk, hit a batter with the second pitch, and allowed two walks before being removed from the game.

References

External links

Fordham Rams bio

1995 births
Living people
People from Bay Shore, New York
Baseball players from New York (state)
Major League Baseball pitchers
New York Yankees players
Fordham Rams baseball players
Pulaski Yankees players
Charleston RiverDogs players
Staten Island Yankees players
Tampa Tarpons players
Trenton Thunder players
Somerset Patriots players
Scranton/Wilkes-Barre RailRiders players
Bay Shore High School alumni